Pístina is a municipality and village in Jindřichův Hradec District in the South Bohemian Region of the Czech Republic. It has about 100 inhabitants. The historic centre of the village is well preserved and is protected by law as a village monument zone.

References

Villages in Jindřichův Hradec District